Timothy James Holding (born 21 August 1972) is a former Australian politician. He was a Labor Party member of the Victorian Legislative Assembly from 1999 to 2013. He served as minister for water; minister for finance, WorkCover and the Transport Accident Commission; and minister for tourism and major events in the Brumby Ministry.

Early life
Holding was educated at Haileybury College and the University of Melbourne, graduating with a Bachelor of Laws in 1997. From the early 1990s he was active in the Australian Labor Party and Young Labor; being elected President of Australian Young Labor in 1993; working as an electorate officer to state and federal Members of Parliament, and later as an assistant ministerial adviser, including for Senator Robert Ray (Minister for Defence).

He served in 126 Signals Squadron of the 1st Commando Regiment in the Australian Army Reserve from 1991 until 1993.

Political career

Local government
Holding served on the City of Waverley council between 1992 and 1994.

State government
In 1999, Holding was elected to Victorian Legislative Assembly as the Member for Springvale at the age of 27. In 2002 he was elected the Member for Lyndhurst and appointed minister for manufacturing and exports, and minister for the financial services industry. Earning praise from former premier, Steve Bracks, as a 'rising star' of the government he was promoted in 2005 to the position of minister for police and emergency services and minister for corrections.

Although there was a swing of 3.0% against Labor, Holding easily won the safe Labor seat of Lyndhurst in the 2006 state election by a margin of 25.1%.

After the 2006 election, he was given the portfolios of finance (including WorkCover and the Transport Accident Commission) and tourism as well as information and communication technology. Some initially saw this as a demotion, but Premier Steve Bracks described Holding as having done a 'great job' with finance being seen as central to government decision-making with fewer potential political difficulties than the notoriously tricky police portfolio.

Due to his relative youth and prominence, Holding has often been touted as a possible future Victorian Labor leader. He is recognised for his ability to master complex policy issues and combine this with his political capacity. Holding is well regarded by his colleagues who would value these attributes in the event of a vacancy for the Labor leadership. Holding suffered some criticism for his performance as police minister, however this would be unlikely to effect his chances of promotion given his steady performance in his current portfolios.

He was promoted in an August 2007 reshuffle following the ascension of John Brumby to the premiership, receiving the responsibilities he held until the Labor party was voted out in the 2010 election. Holding had been touted as a serious candidate for treasurer, but lost out to John Lenders.

On 15 February 2013, Holding announced his resignation as shadow treasurer, shadow minister for industry and as the Member for Lyndhurst.

Post-political career 
Since retiring from Parliament, Holding completed a Masters in Advanced Global Studies at SciencesPo in Paris. In February 2018 he was appointed as a Visiting Professor at King's College in London.

Disappearance and rescue
On 31 August 2009, Holding was reported missing after he failed to return from a solo hiking expedition of Mount Feathertop, Victoria's second highest mountain, having walked up the Bungalow Spur. He was due to return at 4pm on Sunday 30 August, but made no contact with his family. Holding was located by the Australian Federal Police and was rescued on 1 September by a Victoria Police helicopter during a large scale search involving the Victoria Police Search and Rescue Squad, the State Emergency Service and Bush Search and Rescue Victoria.

References

1972 births
Living people
People educated at Haileybury (Melbourne)
Members of the Victorian Legislative Assembly
Australian Army soldiers
Melbourne Law School alumni
Australian Labor Party members of the Parliament of Victoria
Labor Right politicians
21st-century Australian politicians